The 2016–17 Ascenso MX season is a two-part competition: Apertura 2016 began on 15 July 2016 and Clausura 2017. Ascenso MX is the second-tier football league of Mexico. All Ascenso MX teams except UAEM, U. de C., Tampico Madero, Correcaminos, Zacatepec and Sonora, will participate in Copa MX. The fixtures were announced on 9 June 2016.

Changes from the previous season
 Necaxa were promoted to Liga MX.
 Sinaloa were relegated from Liga MX.
 U. de C. will join from Segunda División de México (due to stadium requirements failed in 2015, approved in 2016).
 UAEM were promoted from Segunda División de México
 Tampico Madero were promoted to Ascenso MX as an expansion team, will take the open spot vacated by Atlético San Luis. 
 Atlético San Luis were dissolved and may return to play next season.

Stadiums and Locations

Personnel and kits

Managerial changes

Apertura 2016

Results

Season statistics

Top goalscorers
Players sorted first by goals scored, then by last name.

Source: ESPN FC

Hat-tricks

Liguilla (Playoffs)
The eight best teams play two games against each other on a home-and-away basis. The winner of each match up is determined by aggregate score. If the teams are tied, the away goals rule applies. The higher seeded teams play on their home field during the second leg.

 If the two teams are tied after both legs, the away goals rule applies. If both teams still tied, higher seeded team advances.
 Teams are re-seeded every round.
 The winner will qualify to the playoff match vs (Clausura 2017 Champions) . However, if the winner is the same in both tournaments, they would be the team promoted to the 2017–18 Liga MX season without playing the Promotional Final

Quarterfinals

First leg

Second leg

Semifinals

First leg

Second leg

Final

First leg

Second leg

Clausura 2017

Regular season

Standings

Positions by round

Results

Regular season statistics

Top goalscorers
Players sorted first by goals scored, then by last name.

Source: AscensoMX.net

Hat-tricks

Liguilla (Playoffs)
The eight best teams play two games against each other on a home-and-away basis. The winner of each match up is determined by aggregate score. If the teams are tied, the away goals rule applies. The higher seeded teams play on their home field during the second leg.

 Teams are re-seeded each round.
 Team with more goals on aggregate after two matches advances.
 Away goals rule is applied in the quarterfinals and semifinals, but not the final.
 In the quarterfinals and semifinals, if the two teams are tied on aggregate and away goals, the higher seeded team advances.
 In the final, if the two teams are tied after both legs, the match goes to extra-time and, if necessary, a shootout.
 The champion qualifies to the Promotion Final against Apertura 2016 champion Sinaloa.

Quarterfinals

All times are UTC−6.

First leg

Second leg

Semifinals

All times are UTC−6.

First leg

Second leg

Final

All times are UTC−6.

First Leg

Second Leg

Promotion Final
The Promotion Final is a two-legged playoff between the winners of the Apertura and Clausura tournaments to determine which team will be promoted to Liga MX. The Apertura 2016 champion was Sinaloa and the Clausura 2017 champion was BUAP. Since Sinaloa are higher ranked on the aggregate table for the 2016-17 season than BUAP, they will play the second leg at home.

All times are UTC−6.

First Leg

Second Leg

Aggregate table
The Aggregate Table is the general ranking for the 2016-17 season. This table is a sum of the Apertura and Clausura tournaments.

Relegation table
Relegation to Liga Premier de Ascenso was reinstated this year to Ascenso MX. The relegated team will be the one with the lowest ratio of points to matches played in the following tournaments: Apertura 2014, Clausura 2015, Apertura 2015, Clausura 2016, Apertura 2016 and Clausura 2017.

Last update: 15 April 2017
R = Relegated

References

Ascenso MX seasons